Doom Mountain is a mountain on the Brooks Peninsula on Vancouver Island in British Columbia, Canada. It was so named by Richard Hebda of the Royal British Columbia Museum because of the foreboding appearance of sheer cliffs, and because the mountain top was usually shrouded in cloud while the rest of the area was clear.

References

Mountains of British Columbia under 1000 metres
Kyuquot Sound region
Vancouver Island Ranges
Rupert Land District